Papa Uta is a village on the island of Savai'i in Samoa. It is situated at the west side of the island in the political district of Vaisigano. The population is 505.

References

Populated places in Vaisigano